İlker Ayrık (born 16 October 1979) is a Turkish actor, TV presenter, and director.

Life and career 
Ayrık was born on 16 October 1979 in Balıkesir. He is Macedonian on his mother's side and Albanian on his father's side. He stated that he dreamed of being an engineer when he was in high school, but after taking part in a theatre play at school, he gave up this dream and decided to become a stage actor. He graduated from Müjdat Gezen Art Center Conservatory's Theatre Department in 2003. After finishing school, he worked as Müjdat Gezen's assistant for 6 years. After graduating from school, Ayrık worked with MSM Oyuncuları, Müjdat Gezen Theatre, Tiyatro Ti, and Kent Oyuncuları before founding Pervasız Theatre with Aykut Taşkın in 2005.

In 2009, he played in Doa's "Yallah" music video alongside  and Aykut Taşkın. Between 2007 and 2009, he joined the Kent Oyuncuları where he was part of an adaptation of The Miser. In addition to his career on stage, Ayrık has appeared in many movies, TV series and advertisements since 2001. He acted alongside Kıvanç Tatlıtuğ several times in Akbank advertisements. He is best known for her role as "Accountant Servet" in the Çakallarla Dans movie series. He played the character of "Çağatay" in the TV series Seksenler, which was broadcast on TRT1 between 2012 and 2022.

He married his secondary school friend Sanem Ayrık in 2009, and they have 2 children named Ferit and Yaman from this marriage.

Filmography

Theatre

Television programs

Awards and nominations

References

External links 
 
 
 

1979 births
Living people
Turkish male film actors
Turkish male stage actors
Turkish male television actors
Turkish television presenters
Turkish people of Albanian descent
Turkish people of Macedonian descent